Lubianków  is a village in the administrative district of Gmina Głowno, within Zgierz County, Łódź Voivodeship, in central Poland.

In the village there is a primary school, named after Maria Konopnicka. The first school was established in the village in year 1918.

In 2011 the village had an approximate population of 304.

References

External links
School website

Villages in Zgierz County
Łódź Voivodeship (1919–1939)